William Embry Wrather (January 20, 1883 – November 28, 1963) was an American geologist.

Biography
He was born on a farm near Brandenburg in Meade County, Kentucky on January 20, 1883. He died in his home in Washington, DC on Thursday, November 28, 1963. He was the only son of Richard Anselm and Glovy Washington (Munford) Wrather. Wrather moved to Chicago at the age of 14 to live with relatives and to attend South Chicago High School. Wrather entered the University of Chicago in 1902 and received his ph.B. in Geology in 1907. During the summer of 1907, Wrather was a field assistant on a US Geological Survey party in the mountains of western Montana. Wrather worked temporarily in clerical positions before going to work for Guffey Petroleum from 1908-1916. On December 30, 1910, he married his high school sweetheart, Alice Mildred Dolling in Chicago, Illinois. In 1916, Wrather resigned to search for new oil fields. In 1918 his efforts contributed to the identification of the Desdemona field in Comanche County, Texas. Wrather's interest in the Desdemona field amounted to three quarters of a million dollars.

Wrather then moved to Dallas an opened an office as a consulting geologist. On the recommendation of the National Research Council, Wrather was appointed United States delegate to successive International Geological Congresses in Spain, South Africa, Russia, the Netherlands, and Algeria. Wrather was a founding member of the American Association of Petroleum Geologists. He served as Secretary-Treasurer in 1918 and as Chairman of the Research Committee from 1923 to 1933. He was a member of the Scientific Advisory Committee for the Chicago World's Fair in 1933. He also served as President of the Texas State Historical Association for seven years.

In 1940, Wrather was selected General Chairman for the Dallas annual meeting of the American Association for the Advancement of Science, of which he became a member in 1917 and a Fellow in 1925. In 1943, he was appointed Treasurer of the Association and he served in that capacity of 11 years. Wrather was also a First Vice President of the Geological Society of America and a President (1934) of the Society of Economic Geologists. He served as president of the American Institute of Mining, Metallurgical, and Petroleum Engineers in 1948. In 1951, he was chosen to be a Life Trustee of the National Geographic Society.

In 1942, Wrather came to Washington, DC to be the Assistant Chief of the Foreign Economic Administration for Metals and Minerals. In 1943, upon the retirement of Walter Curran Mendenhall, the National Academy of Sciences recommended Wrather as a potential candidate for appointment and he was selected to be the Director of the US Geological Survey.

USGS career
In 1943, as the Federal Government began planning for the postwar era, Director Walter Curran Mendenhall, who had served 2 years beyond then mandatory retirement age by Presidential exemption, was succeeded by William Embry Wrather. For most of his life, Wrather, a graduate of the University of Chicago who had been a Survey field assistant in 1907, had been an eminently successful consulting petroleum geologist, but when he was named Director he was Associate Chief of the Metals and Minerals Division of the Board of Economic Warfare. In the fall of 1943, Wrather was a member of the small mission sent by the Petroleum Administrator for War, Harold L. Ickes, to appraise the petroleum resources of the Middle East, and Thomas Brennan Nolan, a geologist in the Metals Section who had played a leading role in the strategic-minerals program, became Acting Director. In January 1956, after Director Wrather retired because of illness and age, Assistant Director Thomas Brennan Nolan became the US Geological Survey's seventh Director.

Awards and honors
 Honorary Membership - American Association of Petroleum Geologists (1943)
 Alumni Medal - Chicago University (1943)
 Honorary Doctorate - Southern Methodist University (1945)
 Honorary Doctorate - Colorado School of Mines (1947)
 Honorary Doctorate - University of Kentucky (1950)
 Anthony F. Lucas Award - American Institute of Mining and Metallurgical Engineers (1950)
 Honorary Doctorate - Montana School of Mines (1952)
 John Fritz Medal - American Society of Civil Engineers, et al. (1954)
 Distinguished Service Award - US Department of the Interior (1954)
 Sidney Powers Memorial Award - American Association of Petroleum Geologists (1956)

Publications
 Wrather, William Embry "The Vinton, Louisiana, oil field" Bulletin of the American Association of Petroleum Geologists, vol.5, no.2, pp. 339–340, Mar 1921
 Wrather, William Embry "Supposed igneous rock from Wichita County, Texas, wells" Bulletin of the American Association of Petroleum Geologists, vol.5, no.4, pp. 512–515, Jul 1921
 Wrather, William Embry "Dinosaur tracks in Hamilton County, Texas" Journal of Geology, vol.30, no.5, pp. 354–360, Jul 1922
 Wrather, William Embry "What of our future oil supply?" Economic Geology, vol. 23, no. 3, pp. 331–333, May 1928
 Wrather, William Embry and Frederic H. Lahee. "Problems of petroleum geology; a sequel to Structure of typical American oil fields" American Association of Petroleum Geologists (1934) 1073 pp.
 Wrather, William Embry "Trends in petroleum-production practice" Economic Geology and the Bulletin of the Society of Economic Geologists, vol.30, no.7, pp. 735–749, Nov 1935
 Wrather, W E "Coal in Alaska (USGS)" Miscellaneous Report - Alaska Territorial Department of Mines, Report: MR-195-26, 10 pp., 1943
 Wrather, William Embry "Wartime duties of U.S.G.S. cover multitude of services" Oil & Gas Journal, vol. 42, no. 46, pp. 102, Mar 1944
 Wrather, William Embry "Mineral resources and resourcefulness" Mines Magazine, vol.36, no.5, pp. 185–186, May 1946
 Wrather, William Embry "A new tool for marine geology" The Military Engineer, vol.44, no.302, pp. 411–412, Nov 1952
 Wrather, William Embry "The search for minerals, petroleum, and water resources" Mines Magazine, vol.43, no.1, pp. 39–42, Jan 1953
 Brantly, J.E. Memorial to William Embry Wrather, GSA Bulletin; April 1964; v. 75; no. 4; p. P71-P76
 Pratt, Wallace E. "William Embry Wrather (1883-1963)" AAPG Bulletin; October 1964; v. 48; no. 10; p. 1733-1738

References

William Embry Wrather bio. U.S. Geological Survey, U.S. Department of the Interior

External links
 Portrait of William Embry Wrather via the US Geological Survey
 Photograph of William Embry Wrather via the US Geological Survey

20th-century American geologists
1883 births
1963 deaths
United States Geological Survey personnel
University of Chicago alumni
People from Brandenburg, Kentucky